John Matthew O'Connell (August 10, 1872 – December 6, 1941) was a U.S. Representative from Rhode Island.

Born in Westerly, Washington County, Rhode Island, O'Connell attended the public schools.
He taught in the local schools 1892-1902.
He was graduated from the Philadelphia (Pennsylvania) Dental College (now a branch of Temple University) in 1905 and commenced practice in Westerly, Rhode Island, the same year.
During World War I he served for sixteen months with Headquarters Sanitary Train, Twelfth Division, and later as a major in the United States Dental Reserve.
He served as member of the State house of representatives 1929-1932.

O'Connell was elected as a Democrat to the Seventy-third, Seventy-fourth, and Seventy-fifth Congresses (March 4, 1933 – January 3, 1939).
He was not a candidate for renomination in 1938.
He died in Westerly, Rhode Island, December 6, 1941.
He was interred in St. Sebastian Cemetery.

Sources

External links 

1872 births
1941 deaths
Temple University alumni
People from Westerly, Rhode Island
United States Army officers
Democratic Party members of the United States House of Representatives from Rhode Island